The 2019 Luton Borough Council election took place on 2 May 2019 to elect members of the Luton Borough Council in England. It was held on the same day as other local elections.

Results summary

|-

Ward results

Barnfield

Biscot

Bramingham

Challney

Crawley

Dallow

Farley

High Town

Icknield

Leagrave

Lewsey

Limbury

Northwell

Round Green

Saints

South

Stopsley

Sundon Park

Wigmore

By-elections

Icknield

High Town

Round Green

South

Dallow

References

2019 English local elections
May 2019 events in the United Kingdom
2019
21st century in Bedfordshire